Socialist Standard is a monthly socialist magazine published without interruption since September 1904 by the Socialist Party of Great Britain (SPGB). The magazine is written in a simple, direct style and focuses mainly on socialist advocacy and Marxian analysis of current events, particularly those affecting the United Kingdom. Some articles have been published in party pamphlets.

History 

The first editor was Robert Elrick. The Socialist Standard has also carried translations of continental writers. Under the Defence of the Realm Act 1914, it was placed on a secret list of papers and magazines banned for export during World War I for its call for workers to refuse to fight for their countries and instead join the class war. In 1915, it published an article written by a member of the Bolshevik party calling for a socialist solution to the war. In 1918, the paper voiced the first doubts of the SPGB regarding the Bolshevik Revolution in Russia.

Edgar Hardcastle began a long period of contributions in the 1920s leading eventually to an over thirty-year editorship of the Socialist Standard. In the 1930s, it drew on the reports from Spain to produce articles on the looming menace of aerial warfare. During World War II, the magazine evaded the censor largely by producing a series of articles on the Peloponnesian and similar ancient wars as a cover for the SPGB's opposition to the current one.

Centenary 
To celebrate the party's centenary in 2004, seventy articles were selected from over ten thousand from its history were compiled and published in May in a book called Socialism or Your Money Back. June 2004 issue of the Socialist Standard was a special issue to commemorate the party centenary and detail the party history. September 2004 issue of the Socialist Standard was a special issue to commemorate the publication centenary of the Socialist Standard.

Present 
The SPGB maintains that it is not a left-wing organisation nor the Socialist Standard a left-wing journal. "Left-wing", it contends, has simply become an umbrella designation for protest groups and organisations demanding amendments and reforms to capitalism. The SPGB and the World Socialist Movement (with which the SPGB is associated), contrary to the views and aspirations of these myriad groups and organisations that would claim to be left-wing, affirms that capitalism is incapable of meaningful reform and that quintessentially the basis of the exploitation of the working class is the wages/money system.

According to Richard Montague:
The SPGB holds that the limping democracy extant in most countries today, and certainly, in the developed countries, can be used as a weapon of social revolution; if the majority desired a socialist society, a wageless, classless, moneyless condition wherein goods and services were produced solely for need, there is no power capable of resisting its demand.

Former editors 
 Robert Elrick
 Jack Fitzgerald
 Albert E. Jacomb
 Adolph Kohn
 Edgar Hardcastle
 Gilbert McLatchie (Gilmac)
 Harry Waite
 Ralph Critchfield
 Stan Hampson
 Eddie Critchfield
 John Crump
 Robert Barltrop
 Gwynn Thomas
 Alan D'Arcy
 Pat Deutz
 Melvin Tenner
 Janie Percy-Smith
 Judith Skinner
 Paul Bennett

See also 
 Western Socialist

References

Bibliography

External links 
 Current Issues
 Historical articles archive
 Socialist Standard Past & Present Blog

1904 establishments in the United Kingdom
Monthly magazines published in the United Kingdom
Political magazines published in the United Kingdom
Magazines published in London
Magazines established in 1904
Marxist magazines
Socialist magazines
Socialist Party of Great Britain